The 1915 Southwest Texas State football team was an American football team that represented Southwest Texas State Normal School—now known as Texas State University–as an independent during the 1915 college football season. Led by C. Spurgeon Smith in his third and final season as head coach, the team finished the season with a record of 5–3–2. The team's captain was R. O. Dietert, who played end and quarterback.

Schedule

References

Southwest Texas State
Texas State Bobcats football seasons
College football winless seasons
Southwest Texas State Bobcats football